The Dates Ground, also known as Hapoel Ground was a football ground in the Montefiore neighborhood of Tel Aviv, Israel. The ground was in use between 1941 and 1949, and was abandoned when the club moved to play in an already built stadium in Jaffa, on which the current Bloomfield Stadium stands.

See also
Sports in Israel

References
Hapoel's Tin Plates Ground Danny Recht, Tel Aviv 100 

Defunct football venues in Israel
Hapoel Tel Aviv F.C.
Sports venues in Tel Aviv